Blood & Chocolate: Original Motion Picture Soundtrack is the soundtrack for the film Blood & Chocolate, released on January 26, 2007 over Lakeshore Records.

History
The following songs are included on the soundtrack CD, but they can not be heard in the movie. According to Lakeshore Records, the soundtrack album features "exclusive remixes of the Johnny Klimek and Reinhold Heil score as well as an array of original material as well as covers of classic songs inspired by the film".

Track listing
 "Stripped" - Shiny Toy Guns
 "A Forest" - Lunar Click
 "Blood"  - Sparklemotion
 "How Soon Is Now" - Bobby Gold
 "New Skin" - New Skin
 "Terrible Lie"  - Mercury Falls
 "Out of City"  - Johnny Klimek and Reinhold Heil
 "I Started Something" - Bow Wow Wow
 "The Killing Moon"  - The Distants
 "Haunted When the Minutes Drag" - Collide
 "Chocolate" - Work
 "Venus In Furs" - Black Rainbow
 "Halloween" - Tre Lux
 "Flesh for Fantasy" - Fiction Company
 "Love Will Tear Us Apart" - Philistine
 "Kissing a Wolf"  - Johnny Klimek and Reinhold Heil

Score
Blood & Chocolate: Original Motion Picture Score was composed by Johnny Klimek, Reinhold Heil, Gabriel Isaac Mounsey and Bruce Winter.

 Angels In the Snow	
 Wolf Church
 Red	
 Gabriel/Heritage	
 The Distillery	
 Wolf Girl	
 The First Hunt	
 Krall's End	
 Wolf Eyes
 Pack Meets Leader	
 Searching for Vivian		
 Bone Church	
 Rafe & Aidan Fight		
 Rafe's Death	
 Take It, It's Silver
 You Should Have Left Me	
 My Son Is Dead	
 The Gathering	
 The Second Hunt	
 The Creek
 The River	
 Vivian Wounded
 Film Warehouse	
 Kissing a Wolf
 Run Free Little Girl	
 Pharmacy	
 Vivian Released	
 Distillery Fight	
 Gabriel's End

Unofficial soundtrack
Songs that were featured in the movie. Some of them were remixed and added into the soundtrack.

 "Garab - Rachid Taha
 "Let Yourself Go Wild" - Jasmin Tabatabai
 "Velvet Hills" - Katja Riemann
 "You Know the Truth" - Aurah
 "Cash Machine" - Hard-Fi
 "Amor Fati" - Aurah
 "Silence Summons You" - The Sofa Club
 "Eu Te Iubesc Prea Mult" - Nicolae Guță
 "Stand My Ground" - Within Temptation

Footnotes

External links
 Official MySpace

2007 compilation albums
2007 soundtrack albums
Fantasy film soundtracks
Horror film soundtracks